Sasu Hovi (born August 12, 1982) is a Finnish professional ice hockey goaltender who played with HC Slovan Bratislava in the Slovak Extraliga. He currently plays for HC Kometa Brno in Czech Extraliga.

References

External links

1982 births
Living people
HC Slovan Bratislava players
HC Kometa Brno players
VHK Vsetín players
Finnish ice hockey goaltenders
Finnish expatriate ice hockey players in Slovakia
People from Akaa
Sportspeople from Pirkanmaa
Finnish expatriate ice hockey players in the Czech Republic